Syritta asiatica is a species of syrphid fly in the family Syrphidae.

Distribution
Tajikistan.

References

Eristalinae
Diptera of Asia
Insects described in 2005